is the CEO of Fuji Optical in Hokkaido Japan, and the recipient of the 2006 Nansen Refugee Award.

Early life
Kanai was born in 1942 on the northern Pacific island of Sakhalin. He was forcibly displaced as a child in the turmoil of the end of World War II and moved to Japan. His early life experiences forever shaped his perception of internally displaced people and refugees.

Career
He studied for a business degree at Waseda University in Tokyo. In 1966 he decided to study a second subject and enrolled at the Southern California College of Optometry and graduated in 1972 as a doctor. After visiting Hopi Indians in Arizona and helping them improve their vision by distributing spectacles he realized that he wanted to continue on the pathway of humanitarian work. He returned to Japan in 1973 to work in the family concern Fuji Optical at Hokkaido. In 1996 he became the president of the company. In 2006 he was the CEO and chairman of Fuji Optical.

Work with refugees and internally displaced people
Kanai began his work with refugees in 1983 in Thailand with Indochinese refugees. Many of the refugees with impaired eyesight had lost or broken their glasses in the process of fleeing. They were in desperate need to see clearly as they had to undergo courses ahead of being resettled and needed to study. He checked their eyesight so that the refugees could receive the right kind of glasses and see clearly again.

He began cooperating with UNHCR in 1984 and conducted over 24 missions in Azerbaijan, Armenia, Thailand, and Nepal. Overall he made cash grants of over US$75,000, trained local medical staff, provided optometry equipment, and donated more than 108,200 pairs of glasses. Fuji Optical is UNHCR's longest-serving corporate partner.  Kanai further involved his company and employees in the Optical Vision Aid Mission. Over 70 of his employees have taken part in the missions using their holidays to assist in the refugee camps.

In 2006 he was awarded the prestigious Nansen Refugee Award for his efforts in helping to improve the vision of refugees. He vowed to pour the prize money of $100.000 back into his humanitarian work in Armenia and Azerbaijan. During his acceptance speech for the award Kanai said: "The award is testimony to the significance that the role of optometry plays in the future of refugees by improving their sight and this empowering them to secure a ‘future in focus’... Eyesight can change one's life. My dream is that a simple pair of glasses can change the lives of refugees and internally displaced persons (IDPs) for the better." By 2016 he had improved the sight of more than 130.000 displaced people.

Awards
 Nansen Refugee Award 2006

References

Optometrists
21st-century Japanese businesspeople
Waseda University alumni
Nansen Refugee Award laureates